Spillmann is a surname. Notable people with the surname include:

Hans Rudolf Spillmann (born 1932), Swiss sports shooter and Olympic medalist
Hans Spillmann (born 1969), Dutch footballer
Joseph Spillmann (1842–1905), Swiss Jesuit priest and children's author
Rodolphe Spillmann (1895–1981), Swiss fencer and Olympics competitor

See also
Spillman (disambiguation)
Spilman (disambiguation)